Pedaya is a moshav in central Israel. Located in the Shephelah near Mazkeret Batya, it falls under the jurisdiction of Gezer Regional Council.

History
The moshav was founded in 1951 immigrants from Iraq. Its name is taken from 2 Kings 23:36:
Jehoiakim was twenty and five years old when he began to reign; and he reigned eleven years in Jerusalem; and his mother's name was Zebudah the daughter of Pedaiah of Rumah.

References

Moshavim
Populated places established in 1951
 
Iraqi-Jewish culture in Israel
Populated places in Central District (Israel)
1951 establishments in Israel